Crystal Bridge may refer to:

Crystal Bridge (Crystal, North Dakota)
Crystal Bridges Museum of American Art, Bentonville, Arkansas
Crystal Bridge, a band, singer, musician or musical ensemble
Crystal Bridge Tropical Conservatory, part of the Myriad Botanical Gardens, Oklahoma City, Oklahoma